Wang International Standard Code for Information Interchange (WISCII) is a proprietary version of ASCII used by Wang Computer Corp on their personal computers and minicomputers in the 1980s. WISCII was used on the Wang PC (an IBM-PC compatible), as well as the Alliance APC, OIS, and VS systems. The first 126 characters were the same as ASCII (7-bit), but the remaining characters (ASCII 127-255), which consisted mostly of international letter symbols, were used only by Wang systems.

Character set

References

ASCII